In architecture, an arris is the sharp edge formed by the intersection of two surfaces, such as the corner of a masonry unit; the edge of a timber in timber framing; the junction between two planes of plaster or any intersection of divergent architectural details. The term also refers to the raised edges which separate the flutings in a Doric column.

The origin of the term arris is from the Latin , meaning the beard or the ear of grain or the bone of a fish. See also arête.

An arris rail is a structural element, whose cross section is a 45 degree isosceles right angled triangle. Arris rails are usually made of wood, and are manufactured by cutting a length of square-section timber lengthwise diagonally.  They are used for structures which require joining two timbers at right angles; for example, connecting wooden posts and beams.

Another common use is for the horizontal rails of timber fences, since the diagonal edges prevent water from collecting on top of the wood and thus rotting the timber.  It also adds an element of security, since the fence is harder to climb.

In the 16th century, the Italian architect Cosimo Bartoli alongside various other writers reference the arris in L'architettura. They referred the now known arris as a  within the writing and multiple times reference its uses and functions.

References

External links 

Architectural elements

fr:Arête (géométrie)